Kettering is a city in Montgomery County, Ohio, United States. It is an inner suburb of Dayton, Ohio. As of the 2020 census, the city had a population of 57,862, making it the largest suburb in Dayton metropolitan area.

History
The area where the city of Kettering now lies was settled from the late 1700s to the mid-1800s, largely as farmland. The population in the area started to grow, prompting the creation of (now defunct) Van Buren Township in 1841. In November 1952, township voters approved incorporating as the Village of Kettering. (In 1953, the western portion of the village voted to secede, forming a new township, which is now the City of Moraine). By 1955, the village's population had grown to 38,118, which qualified it to claim city status, with the official proclamation by the state on June 24. The city is named for inventor Charles F. Kettering, who resided here in his home, Ridgeleigh Terrace, from 1914 until his death in 1958. Charles Kettering is known for his numerous inventions and contributions to Metro Dayton.

From the 1950s to the 1970s, Kettering's population continued to grow, adding more than 30,000 residents. This growth was due in part to the many people who started migrating out of nearby Dayton after World War II. Since the 1980s, Kettering has experienced a slow decline in population due to an aging population and loss of manufacturing jobs.

Geography

The city is bordered by Dayton, Riverside, and Oakwood to the north; West Carrollton and Moraine to the west; Miami Township to the southwest; Centerville and Washington Township to the south; and Beavercreek and Sugarcreek Township to the east.

Demographics

2010 census
As of the census of 2010, there were 56,163 people, 25,427 households, and 14,979 families living in the city. The racial makeup of the city was 92.6% White, 3.3% African American, 0.2% Native American, 1.3% Asian, 0.5% from other races, and 2.1% from two or more races. Hispanic or Latino of any race were 2.1% of the population.

There were 25,427 households, of which 26.3% had children under the age of 18 living with them, 43.4% were married couples living together, 11.3% had a female householder with no husband present, 4.3% had a male householder with no wife present, and 41.1% were non-families. 34.9% of all households were made up of individuals, and 13.1% had someone living alone who was 65 years of age or older. The average household size was 2.19 and the average family size was 2.83.

The median age in the city was 40.9 years. 21% of residents were under the age of 18; 8.4% were between the ages of 18 and 24; 25.6% were from 25 to 44; 27% were from 45 to 64; and 18% were 65 years of age or older. The gender makeup of the city was 47.7% male and 52.3% female.

2000 census
As of the census of 2000, there were 57,502 people, 25,657 households, and 15,727 families living in the city. The population density was 3,077.4 people per square mile (1,187.9/km2). There were 26,936 housing units at an average density of 1,441.6 per square mile (556.4/km2). The racial makeup of the city was 95.23% White, 1.66% African American, 0.18% Native American, 1.38% Asian, 0.02% Pacific Islander, 0.33% from other races, and 1.19% from two or more races. Hispanic or Latino of any race were 1.11% of the population.

There were 25,657 households, out of which 26.9% had children under the age of 18 living with them, 48.7% were married couples living together, 9.5% have a single female householder, and 38.7% were non-families. 33.4% of all households were made up of individuals, and 12.7% had someone living alone who was 65 years of age or older. The average household size was 2.22 and the average family size was 2.85.

In the city, the population was spread out, with 22.5% under the age of 18, 7.5% from 18 to 24, 29.4% from 25 to 44, 22.3% from 45 to 64, and 18.3% who were 65 years of age or older. The median age was 39 years. For every 100 females, there were 90.5 males. For every 100 females age 18 and over, there were 86.7 males.

The median income for a household in the city was $45,051, and the median income for a family was $55,849. Males had a median income of $41,558 versus $28,921 for females. The per capita income for the city was $27,009. About 3.2% of families and 4.6% of the population were below the poverty line, including 5.3% of those under age 18 and 3.6% of those age 65 or over.

Government

The city utilizes a council-manager form of government. Seven council representatives are elected for four-year terms on a non-partisan basis. They include the mayor, two at large members, and one member from each of the four wards. The current Mayor is Peggy Lehner.

City services
The Kettering Fire Department is responsible for fire protection in the city. The department has a total of six operational stations and is staffed by 54 career and 50 volunteer firefighters. The fire department is currently undergoing a transformation to reduce the number of stations to five. One station is currently being built on Far Hills Avenue, one will be located on the corner of East David Road and Hempstead Station Drive. The three others are in the planning stage.

Police protection is provided by the Kettering Police Department which comprises 83 sworn officers. The police department is the only agency of its size with dual accreditation from both the Commission on Accreditation for Law Enforcement Agencies and the Commission on Accreditation for Corrections.

Education
The Kettering City School District includes Kettering Fairmont High School, two middle schools (Van Buren and Kettering), and eight elementary schools (Beavertown, Greenmont, Indian Riffle, J.E. Prass, J.F. Kennedy, Oakview, Orchard Park, and Southdale).

On the 2009–2010 Ohio report card, Kettering schools met all 26 state standards in testing, attendance and graduation rates earning the state's highest category, Excellent with Distinction.

Kettering is also home to several private schools—Alexandria Montessori School, Archbishop Alter High School, Ascension School, Emmanuel Christian Academy, St. Albert The Great School, and St. Charles Borromeo School.

Kettering College offers two-year and four-year degrees in several disciplines including Nursing, Sonography, Radiology Technology, Respiratory Therapy, and Human Biology; with a Master of Physician Assistant Studies (MPAS) and an Occupational Therapy Doctorate (OTD).

The Modern College of Design offers two-year degrees in graphic design.

The international headquarters of the Driving Schools Association of the Americas (DSAA) is located in Kettering. The DSAA is one of the largest organizations in the world for the education of vehicle drivers and plays a significant educational role in improving road safety.

Kettering has two public libraries, both branches of the Dayton Metro Library.

Recreation

Kettering has 20 parks totaling  and is home to the Fraze Pavilion, a major outdoor entertainment venue that also hosts the summer concerts of the Dayton Philharmonic.

The James S. Trent Arena, which opened in 2005, has a seating capacity of 4,400 overall as well as 3,650 for championship sporting events, and it is located on the campus of Fairmont High School.

Skate Plaza, a  skateboard park that opened in 2005, was a collaboration between the City of Kettering and Rob Dyrdek, a professional skateboarder who grew up in Kettering.

Rosewood Arts Center, formerly an elementary school, now hosts 100,000 visitors a year with art classes, exhibitions, an art gallery and the Art on the Commons festival.

The Town and Country Shopping Center is a small, partly enclosed and part open-air, mall located in the heart of Kettering near the intersection of Far Hills Ave. and Stroop Rd.

Pondview Park is a self-guided environmental park for people to go experience nature. The park has trails, 6 ponds, a butterfly garden, and many scenic opportunities, for all kinds of people to come and learn about nature.

Notable people
Richard Black, commercial artist and landscape painter, creator of the Mr. Clean mascot
Chris Borland, NFL linebacker
Tony Campana, MLB player
Nancy Cartwright, voice of Bart on The Simpsons
Andrew Chafin, MLB Pitcher
Brooklyn Decker, Sports Illustrated model
Rob Dyrdek, professional skateboarder, MTV personality
Tony P. Hall, member of the U.S. House of Representatives and ambassador to the United Nations Food and Agriculture Organization
A. J. Hawk, NFL linebacker
Brady Hoke, defensive coordinator for the University of Oregon
Jeff Long, vice chancellor and director of athletics at the University of Arkansas, first chairman of the College Football Playoff selection committee
Jim Paxson, NBA player and general manager of the Cleveland Cavaliers
John Paxson, NBA player and executive vice president of basketball operations for the Chicago Bulls
Nathan W. Pyle, cartoonist, Strange Planet
Ted Rall, editorial cartoonist and columnist
Kim Richey, songwriter and singer
Chris Rolfe, MLS player
Gary Sandy, actor, star of comedy series WKRP in Cincinnati
Sherri Saum, Daytime Emmy-nominated actress
Malik Zaire, college Quarterback

Sister cities

References

External links

 Official website

 
Cities in Ohio
Cities in Montgomery County, Ohio
Cities in Greene County, Ohio
Populated places established in 1798
Charles F. Kettering
1798 establishments in the Northwest Territory